James David Ward (born September 19, 1976) is an American musician. A self-taught guitarist and pianist, he is the lead singer and rhythm guitarist for the band Sparta; he is also a co-founder of the post-hardcore band At the Drive-In, which he formed in 1993 when he was 17 years old.

At the Drive-In
While in At the Drive-In, Ward played guitar and sang backup vocals, as well as playing piano and keyboards on select songs. He performed lead vocals on two tracks, entitled "Hourglass" and "Ursa Minor", as well as singing co-lead with lead vocalist Cedric Bixler-Zavala on a number of tracks. Using the money from his college savings, he created the label "Western Breed Records" specifically to release Hell Paso and Alfaro Vive, Carajo!, At the Drive-in's first two releases. After the demise of At the Drive-In, Ward has stated that he is happy with the break-up, that he started the band when he was 17, and felt like he was always 17 while in the band. On January 9, 2012, it was announced that At the Drive-In were reforming.

On March 18, 2016, days before the 2016 reunion tour would start, ATDI announced that Ward would no longer be part of the group, simply stating on their Facebook page that "As our ship prepares for voyage, we announce that Jim Ward will not be joining us on future journeys. We wish him well and are excited to see you soon."

Sparta
Following the split of At the Drive-In, Ward joined with Tony Hajjar and Paul Hinojos as the lead vocalist and guitar player for a new musical project; Matt Miller was later recruited to play the bass guitar. The band, Sparta, wrote nearly nine songs in their first week of rehearsal, with all members incorporating ideas and lyrics. Ward cites Radiohead and Billy Joel as influences for his songwriting during this period, which led to Ward incorporating more piano in Sparta (despite his informal knowledge of the instrument).

Sparta eventually signed a record contract with Geffen and released its debut album, Wiretap Scars, in 2002.

Solo
On June 11, 2021, Ward's solo album Daggers was released by Dine Alone Records.

Personal life
Ward was born in El Paso, Texas. He is a 1994 graduate of El Paso High School. He is the cousin of musician Jeremy Ward.

Discography

With At the Drive-In
 Hell Paso (1994)
 Alfaro Vive, Carajo! (1995)
 Acrobatic Tenement (1997)
 In/Casino/Out (1998)
 Vaya (1999)
 Relationship of Command (2000)
 This Station Is Non-Operational (2005)

With Sparta
 Austere (2002)
 Wiretap Scars (2002)
 Live at La Zona Rosa 3.19.04 (2004)
 Porcelain (2004)
 Threes (2006)
 Trust The River (2020)

With Bobby Byrd
 How Will We Know When We're Dead? (2006)

Solo
 My Favorite Song Writers (compilation – 2004)
- Contributed the song "These Years"
 Paupers, Peasants, Princes & Kings (compilation – 2006)
- Contributed a cover of the song "Lay Lady Lay"
 Quiet (2007)
 In the Valley, On the Shores (2009)
 The End Begins (2011)
 Quiet in the Valley, On The Shores The End Begins (2011)
 Daggers (2021)

With Sleepercar
 West Texas (2008)
 Breathe And Count (2015)

Equipment

With At the Drive-In
Whilst a member of At the Drive-In, Ward used different guitars and amps, as well as several keyboards. The following is a list of some of the equipment Ward performed with during this era:

Guitars
 Gibson Melody Maker
 Epiphone SG Special 1961 50th Anniversary (used at the 2012 Coachella Festival with At the Drive-In)
 Tokai SG-60
 Gibson SG Jr
- Ward has used two of these guitars—a green SG with a white pearl pickguard and a sticker of the Texan flag, and a white version with a tortoise pickguard and a sticker of the Welsh flag. It is difficult to associate a production year with this pair of guitars; whilst both might have been produced before 1965, due to the smaller pick-guard, the guitars also consisted of customized pick-guards (all SG Jr's originally came with black pick-guards) and, therefore, it is possible that they are later models.
 Fernandes Monterey X (custom)
- Ward owned two Monterey X model guitars, one of which had a sticker of the Welsh flag below the bridge.

Amplifiers
 Marshall Cabinet and Head
 Mesa Boogie Head

With Sparta
Ward uses several different guitars and amplifiers while performing with Sparta. Since the equipment Ward uses changes from tour to tour, the following is a list of some of the equipment he has been seen using.

Guitars
 Custom Fender Esquire
- Ward employs two of these, one yellow with a black pickguard, and one black with a white pickguard (50's Series Re-Issue with a Seymour Duncan Alnico 2 Pickup in the bridge)
 Epiphone SG Special 1961 50th Anniversary
 Ibanez Jetking 
 Rickenbacker 330 
 Gibson ES-335 (Ebony finish)
- Bridge pickup was later replaced for a Gibson P-94. This guitar was recently stolen from the band's storage facility in Los Angeles.
 '72 Fender Telecaster Deluxe
- Neck pickup, tone and control dials for neck pickup, and pickup selector removed. Ward employs two of these, one with a black pickguard, and one with a tortoise shell pickguard. However, Ward may have replaced the pickguard at some point, therefore only owning one rather than two.
 Gibson SG
 Gibson Melody Maker

Amplifiers
 Vox AC30
 Marshall Cabinet and Head
 Mesaboogie Head
 Park Head

Effects
BOSS DD-3 Delay
BOSS TR-2 Tremolo
Line 6 DL-4
BOSS Chromatic Tuner
Guyatone MD-3
BOSS GE-7
Klon Centaur
Electro-Harmonix Big Muff (Sovtek)
BOSS DD-3
Ernie Ball Volume Pedals (2)

Side projects
He has an alternative country side project called Sleepercar, where he also plays guitar and sings lead vocals.

References

External links
 Sparta's Official Site
 Jim Ward's page on Vox Amps
 Jim's Five Favorite Songs off Dischord Records
 Interview with Jim on Late Night Wallflower 2008
 Stereokill Interview: January 4th 2009

Musicians from El Paso, Texas
Sparta (band) members
At the Drive-In members
Living people
American rock guitarists
American male guitarists
American male singers
American pianists
1976 births
American people of Welsh descent
American male pianists
21st-century American singers